d'Aubigny may refer to:

Places
Saint-Martin-d'Aubigny,

People
Claude de Boutroue d'Aubigny
Hugh d'Aubigny, 5th Earl of Arundel
Julie d'Aubigny
Nigel d'Aubigny
Philip d'Aubigny (ca. 1166 – ca. 1236), knight and royal chancellor
William d'Aubigny (disambiguation), several people:
William d'Aubigny (died 1139)
William d'Aubigny (Brito)
William d'Aubigny (rebel)
William d'Aubigny, 1st Earl of Arundel
William d'Aubigny, 2nd Earl of Arundel
William d'Aubigny, 3rd Earl of Arundel
William d'Aubigny, 4th Earl of Arundel

Other
Seigneur d'Aubigny,